Incapacitation may refer to:

 Incapacitation (penology), one of the functions of punishment
 Incapacity, a legal disqualification

See also 
 Incapable (disambiguation)
 Incapacitant
 Incapacitating agent
 Knockout (disambiguation)